The National Unified USSD Platform (NUUP), also known as the *99# service, is a platform that provides access to the Unified Payment Interface (UPI) service over the USSD protocol. Initiated by the Government of India and developed by the National Payments Corporation of India (NPCI), it facilitates access to banking services from mobile phones.

The USSD code to access the NUUP is *99#. The Telecom Regulatory Authority of India (TRAI) has set a maximum ceiling of 1.5 per transaction for accessing the NUUP, although rates can differ among service providers.

References

External links 
 Roll out more user-friendly version of USSD for cashless payments: CMs Decanchronicle.com
 Simpler USSD for digital payments on the anvil: Chandrababu Naidu thehindu.com
 New Simple USSD For Feature Phones ndtv.com
 Feature phones set to get their own mobile banking platform hindustantimes.com
 IMPS Is Five: Time To Tap Unrealized Potential igovernment.in

Banking in India
Mobile payments in India